"Roll a D6" is a parody of Far East Movement's song "Like a G6" adapted by Connor Anderson. The song was written during a game of Dungeons & Dragons in about four hours and the whole video took about four weeks to complete. The song, recorded despite the fact that Anderson had only occasionally played Dungeons & Dragons, was accompanied by a music video which gained 40,000 views in four days, and  has received more than 2.4 million views.

References

External links

2010 songs
Dungeons & Dragons
Musical parodies
Viral videos